Pahalgam Assembly constituency is one of the 87 constituencies in the Jammu and Kashmir Legislative Assembly of Jammu & Kashmir a northern state of India. Pahalgam is also part of Anantnag Lok Sabha constituency.

Member of Legislative Assembly

 1967: Makhan Lal Fotedar, Indian National Congress
 1972: Makhan Lal Fotedar, Indian National Congress
 1977: Piyaree Lal Handoo, Jammu & Kashmir National Conference
 1983: Piyaree Lal Handoo, Jammu & Kashmir National Conference
 1987: Rafi Ahmad Mir, Jammu & Kashmir National Conference
 1996: Kabir Bhat, Jammu & Kashmir National Conference
 2002: Mehbooba Mufti, Jammu & Kashmir People's Democratic Party
 2004 (By Polls): Mufti Mohammad Sayeed, Jammu & Kashmir People's Democratic Party
 2008: Rafi Ahmad Mir, Jammu & Kashmir People's Democratic Party

Election results

2014

See also
 Pahalgam
 Anantnag district
 List of constituencies of Jammu and Kashmir Legislative Assembly

References

Assembly constituencies of Jammu and Kashmir
Anantnag district